The 1993 Russian Indoor Athletics Championships was the 2nd edition of the national championship in indoor track and field for Russia. It was held on 27–28 February at the Alexander Gomelsky Universal Sports Hall CSKA in Moscow. A total of 28 events (14 for men and 14 for women) were contested over the two-day competition. For the first time at the national championships, women's pole vault was held.

Championships
In the winter of 1993, Russian championships were also held in individual athletics disciplines:

30 January – Russian 12-Hour Run Indoor Championships (Lipetsk)
5–6 February – Russian Combined Events Indoor Championships (Saint Petersburg)
27–28 February – Russian 24-Hour Indoor Championships (Podolsk)

Results

Men

Women 

 Lyudmila Narozhilenko was the original runner-up in the women's 60 m with a time of 7.18 seconds. However, she was subsequently disqualified as she had previously failed a doping test on 13 February 1993 at the Meeting Pas de Calais. Following a lengthy trial, the athlete was disqualified for four years, and her results after the test date were canceled in accordance with the rules, including her performance at the 1993 national indoor championships.

Russian 12-Hour Run Indoor Championships 
The Russian 12-hour Run Indoor Championships was held on 30 January in Lipetsk in the athletics arena of the Yubileiny Sports Palace.

Men

Women

Russian Combined Events Indoor Championships
The Russian Combined Events Indoor Championships were determined on 5–6 February 1993 in St. Petersburg at the Winter Stadium.

Men

Women

24-hour run
The Russian 24-Hour Run Indoor Championships were held on 27–28 February in Podolsk on the 133-meter circle of the arena of the local youth sports school. Nikolai Safin exceeded the previous world record with a distance of 275,576 m, but it was not officially recognised as a world record due to the uncertified length of the track.

Men

Women

International team selection 
According to the results of the national championships, taking into account qualifying standards, the Russian team for the 1993 IAAF World Indoor Championships included:

Men 
60 m: Aleksandr Porkhomovskiy
200 m: Andrey Fedoriv
400 m: Dmitry Kosov
60 m hurdles: Aleksandr Markin
Pole vault: Radion Gataullin, Igor Trandenkov
Long jump: Stanislav Tarasenko
Triple jump: Vasiliy Sokov, Vladimir Melikhov
Shot put: Sergey Smirnov
5000 m walk: Mikhail Shchennikov, Mikhail Orlov

Women 
60 m: Irina Privalova, Olga Bogoslovskaya
200 m: Irina Privalova, Natalya Voronova
400 m: Tatyana Alekseyeva
4 × 400 m relay: Tatyana Alekseyeva, Yelena Ruzina, Marina Shmonina, Yelena Andreyeva
800 m: Svetlana Masterkova, Yelena Afanasyeva
1500 m: Yekaterina Podkopayeva
3000 m: Olga Kovpotina
60 m hurdles: Yuliya Graudyn
High jump: Evgenia Zhdanova
Long jump: Irina Mushailova, Yolanda Chen
Triple jump: Yolanda Chen, Inna Lasovskaya
Shot put: Svetlana Krivelyova, Anna Romanova
Pentathlon: Irina Belova, Irina Tyukhay
3000 m walk: Yelena Arshintseva, Yelena Nikolayeva

References

Results
Открытый чемпионат России // Лёгкая атлетика : журнал. — 1993. — № 4. — С. 2—3.
На стадионах страны и мира. Открытый чемпионат России в помещении // Лёгкая атлетика : журнал. — 1993. — № 4. — С. 16.

Russian Indoor Athletics Championships
Russian Indoor Athletics Championships
Russian Indoor Athletics Championships
Russian Indoor Athletics Championships
Sports competitions in Moscow
1993 in Moscow